Kerry Burtnyk (born November 24, 1958) is a Canadian curler from Winnipeg, Manitoba. He grew up in Reston, Manitoba. He is a two time Canadian champion skip, and the 1995 World Champion skip. He is currently the coach of the Darcy Robertson rink.

Career
Burtnyk's first Brier in 1981 would be a success for him. His Manitoba team of Mark Olson, Jim Spencer and Ron Kammerlock defeated Northern Ontario, skipped by Al Hackner in the final. Burtnyk became the youngest skip to win the Brier in history, as he was 22 years and 4 months old at the time. At that year's World Championship, Burtnyk would have to settle for the bronze medal.

Burtnyk returned to the Brier in 1988, but he missed the playoffs despite a 7–4 record.

He returned to the Brier once again in 1995 where he would win his second Brier with teammates Jeff Ryan, Rob Meakin and Keith Fenton. In the final, Burtnyk defeated Saskatchewan, skipped by Brad Heidt. At the Worlds, Burtnyk and his team claimed gold, defeating Scotland and their skip Gordon Muirhead.

In the 2001 Nokia Brier Burtnyk skipped his Manitoba team to the final, but bowed out to the Randy Ferbey skipped-Alberta team. In December of that year, he lost to Kevin Martin in the final of the Canadian Olympic Trials, missing his chance to represent Canada at the 2002 Winter Olympics.

Burtnyk announced his retirement in 2005 from the game, but returned in 2006 with a new team, and would shortly after win the 2008 Manitoba championship over David Bohn. He represented Manitoba in the 2008 Tim Hortons Brier but ended up just outside the playoffs with a 6–5 record.

Burtnyk again announced his retirement following the 2009–10 season. However, he would play alternate for Garth Smith at the provincial 2011 Safeway Championships.

Personal
Burtnyk is married to Patti and has two daughters, Laura and Rachel. He is currently retired.
Burtnyk previously worked as a sales investment advisor for Wellington West.

Grand Slam Record

References

External links
 

1958 births
Living people
Curlers from Winnipeg
Canadian people of Ukrainian descent
World curling champions
Brier champions
Canadian male curlers
Canada Cup (curling) participants
Canadian curling coaches